James Bethune may refer to:
 James Beaton (or Bethune) (1473–1539), Scottish Roman Catholic bishop and Keeper of the Great Seal of Scotland
 James Bethune (1840–1884), Canadian politician
 James Gray Bethune (1793–1841), Canadian businessman and judge
 James Lindesay-Bethune, 16th Earl of Lindsay (born 1955), Scottish businessman and politician